H. pallida may refer to:
 Heisteria pallida, a plant species found in Brazil
 Heliocheilus pallida, a moth species found in Australia
 Heteropsis pallida, a butterfly species found on Madagascar

See also